The Reeds Peak Lookout Tower, at Squeaky Spring in Gila National Forest, on Reeds Peak, New Mexico, was built in 1929.  It was listed on the National Register of Historic Places in 1988.

The original cabin was replaced in 1959. In 1988, its original ladder was still in place, but new stairs were added in 1965.

References

Fire lookout towers on the National Register of Historic Places in New Mexico
National Register of Historic Places in Grant County, New Mexico
Buildings and structures completed in 1929